Lupa is an administrative ward in the Chunya district of the Mbeya Region of Tanzania. In 2016 the Tanzania National Bureau of Statistics report there were 8,396 people in the ward, from 12,835 in 2012.

Villages / vitongoji 
The ward has 3 villages and 16 vitongoji.

 Lyeselo
 Legeza Mwendo
 Lyeselo
 Mapambano
 Ngonilima
 Songambele
 Ifuma
 Chemichemi
 Ifuma
 Kagera
 Kazaroho
 Lupatingatinga
 Forest
 Kivukoni
 Lupatingatinga
 Majengo Mapya
 Mission
 Mtukula
 Vitumbi

References 

Wards of Mbeya Region